Tanzania Government Flight Agency (TGFA) is one of the executive agencies of Tanzania. It provides VIP flight services to government officials. The Tanzania Government Flight Agency supports and manages all Tanzanian government aircraft, which it leases to Air Tanzania Company Limited (ATCL).

History 
The Tanzania Government Flight Agency was established under the Tanzanian Executive Agencies Act No. 30 of 1997, which came into effect on May 17th, 2002 per the Government Notice No. 193. TGFA took over the functions of the Government Flying Unit under the Ministry of Communications and Transport with the purpose of providing air transport services in a more efficient, cost effective, and business-like manner to the Government. In 2018, the Agency was transferred from the Ministry of Works, Transport and Communication to the President’s Office, State House through Government Notice No. 252 of 2018. George Mkuchika was Minister of Transport, heading TGFA, prior to being named Minister of President’s Office Good Governance and Public Services in December 2020. As of December 2020, the Minister of Works and Transport is Leonard Chamuriho, with the airline under the control of Dr. John Magufuli, the President of Tanzania since 2015.

Air Tanzania Leasing 
In the government revitalization plan of Air Tanzania in 2016, the government purchased six new planes through the Government Flight agency that are leased to Air Tanzania. In May 2016, the company purchased two Bombardier Q400s, that it received in September 2016. In December 2016, the company further placed four more orders to acquire two Airbus A220-300, one Bombardier Q400 and one Boeing 787 Dreamliner.

In November 2021 at the Dubai Airshow, the company placed four orders with Boeing for one B787 Dreamliner,  two B737 max and a B767 freighter.

Fleet 
The fleet consists of:

Gallery

References 

Flight
Airlines of Tanzania
Government agencies established in 2002
2002 establishments in Tanzania
W
Tanzania